This is a list of European regions (NUTS2 regions) sorted by their unemployment rate (European definition). Eurostat calculates the unemployment rate based on the information provided by national statistics institutes affiliated to eurostat. The list presents statistics for the years 2006 to 2018 from EUROSTAT, as of March 2019.

2006 to 2018 list

References

External links 
 Eurostat: Regional statistics

Economy of Europe-related lists
Unemployment